The 1907 North Carolina A&M Aggies football team represented the North Carolina A&M Aggies of North Carolina College of Agriculture and Mechanic Arts during the 1907 college football season. Led by first year head coach Mickey Whitehurst, the Aggies compiled a 6–0–1 record and claimed a Southern championship for the South Atlantic teams. This is the first year the team played at Riddick Stadium, then known as New Athletic Park.

Schedule

References

North Carolina AandM
NC State Wolfpack football seasons
College football undefeated seasons
North Carolina AandM Aggies football